Navonda Moore (born November 4, 1984) is an American professional women's basketball player in the WNBA, previously playing for the Minnesota Lynx.

Born in Jackson, Mississippi, Moore attended college at the University of Alabama and graduated in 2007. Following her collegiate career with Alabama Crimson Tide women's basketball, she joined the Lynx as a free agent.

As an undrafted rookie, Moore struggled to get into the Lynx rotation. She averaged 4.6 minutes and 1.1 points in 19 games.

WNBA career statistics

Regular season

|-
| align="left" | 2007
| align="left" | Minnesota
| 19 || 0 || 4.6 || .269 || .125 || .750 || 0.8 || 0.2 || 0.2 || 0.0 || 0.4 || 1.1
|-
| align="left" | 2008
| align="left" | Minnesota
| 16 || 0 || 7.8 || .319 || .333 || .556 || 0.9 || 0.3 || 0.3 || 0.2 || 0.2 || 3.0
|-
| align="left" | Career
| align="left" | 2 years, 1 team
| 35 || 0 || 6.1 || .301 || .235 || .600 || 0.9 || 0.3 || 0.2 || 0.1 || 0.3 || 2.0

Alabama  statistics
Source

References

External links
WNBA Player Profile
WNBA Prospect Profile

1984 births
Living people
Alabama Crimson Tide women's basketball players
American women's basketball players
Basketball players from Jackson, Mississippi
Minnesota Lynx players
Guards (basketball)
Undrafted Women's National Basketball Association players